Phalacra strigata is a species of moth of the family Drepanidae first described by Brisbane Charles Somerville Warren in 1896. It is found in India, China and Taiwan.

Subspecies
Phalacra strigata strigata (northern India, China: Kwangsi, Kwangtung, Szechwan)
Phalacra strigata insulicola Inoue, 1988 (Taiwan)

References

Moths described in 1896
Drepaninae